Z5 may refer to:
 Harbin Z-5, Chinese helicopter
 Mazda Z engine
 a file extension used by Z-machine
 Z5 (computer) designed by Konrad Zuse
 the GMG Airlines IATA airline code
 German destroyer Z5 Paul Jakobi
 the Beijing-Nanning-Hanoi Through Train (southbound)
 Zbrojovka Z5 Express, a Czech car of the 1930s
 LNER Class Z5, a class of British steam locomotives 
 Nikon Z 5 mirrorless camera